Spanioptila codicaria is a moth of the family Gracillariidae. It is known from Brazil.

References

Gracillariinae